Geltwood was an iron-hulled barque that was shipwrecked on or about 14 June 1876 during a storm on a remote stretch of the south east coast of South Australia. Nearing the completion of her maiden voyage from Liverpool bound for Melbourne the ship struck a reef, capsized and broke up. The wreck  occurred 1.6 km from shore near the northern end of Lake Bonney and 16 km south-east of Southend.

Of the 31 passengers and crew there were no survivors. It wasn't until 5 July that the fate of the ship became known to authorities.

Looters

The events surrounding Geltwood are made infamous by reports of looting by some locals. The wreck was not reported to the police for two weeks, and in that time a number of people stole equipment and belongings that were washed ashore. A trial was held in Millicent which resulted in the acquittal of two men on the grounds they didn't know looting a shipwreck was a crime.

Relics

One of the Geltwood anchors can be viewed in Southend at a lookout on Cape Buffon drive. It is a memorial to those who have perished at sea, including local amateur and professional fishermen who have lost their lives at sea.

Another anchor and memorabilia can be viewed at the Millicent Living History Museum. Some Geltwood artifacts are also displayed in the Beachport museum.

See also
List of shipwrecks of Australia

References

A Shipwreck at Rivoli Bay; Geltwood 1876 at http://www.environment.sa.gov.au/files/4b881c43-c246-4874-8cfb-9e2900d033a0/geltwood.pdf, Retrieved 23 May 2012.
'Geltwood, a brief history of a Harrington barque wrecked on her maiden voyage'on Through Mighty Seas: A Maritime History at http://www.mightyseas.co.uk/marhist/workington_harrington/geltwood.htm, Retrieved 26 March 2008.
'Geltwood Anchor Memorial' in Southend at http://www.southaustralia.com/info.aspx?id=9005361, Retrieved 21 May 2012.
'The Shipwreck Room' at http://www.millicentmuseum.com/shipwreckRoom.htm, Retrieved 21 May 2012.

External links
'Geltwood''  on Ozdiverdowns' YouTube, May 2013

Shipwrecks of South Australia
Maritime incidents in June 1876
1876 ships
Victorian-era merchant ships of the United Kingdom
Sailing ships of the United Kingdom
Barques